The 1951–52 National Hurling League was the 21st season of the National Hurling League.

Division 1

The National Hurling League saw a major restructuring for the 1951-52 season. The old system of a four-group National League was abolished. Division 1 was split into two different groups of seven teams. The top-placed team in each group contested the home final.

Galway came into the season as defending champions of the 1950-51 season.

On 18 May 1952, Tipperary won the title after a 6-14 to 2-5 win over New York in the final. It was their 4th league title overall and their first since 1949-50.

Group A table

Group B table

Knock-out stage

Home final

Final

References

National Hurling League seasons
League
League